Prudencio or Prudêncio may refer to the following people
Given name
Prudencio Benavides (1870–?), Cuban baseball center fielder and manager
Prudencio Cardona (born 1951), Colombian boxer
Prudencio Indurain (born 1968), Spanish cyclist
Prudencio Norales (born 1956), Honduran football midfielder
Prudencio de Orobio y Basterra, Spanish merchant, soldier and government official
Prudencio Ortiz de Rozas (1800–1857), Argentine general
Prudencio de Pena (born 1913), Uruguayan basketball player
Pruden, nickname of the Spanish footballer Prudencio Sánchez Fernández (1916–1998)
Prudencio de Sandoval (1553–1620), Spanish historian and Benedictine monk
San Prudencio, Spanish anchorite and cleric, bishop of Tarazona
San Prudencio festival

Surname
José López Prudencio (1870–1949), Spanish writer 
José Prudencio Padilla (1784–1828), Colombian military leader
Mauricio Prudencio (born 1980), Bolivian swimmer
Miel Prudencio Ma, Filipino cartoonist and illustrator
Nelson Prudêncio (1944–2012), Brazilian triple jumper